Julie Meynen (born 15 August 1997) is a Luxembourgian swimmer. She competed in the women's 100 metre freestyle event at the 2016 Summer Olympics.

In 2019, she represented Luxembourg at the 2019 World Aquatics Championships held in Gwangju, South Korea. She competed in the women's 50 metre freestyle and women's 100 metre freestyle events. In the 50 metres event she advanced to the semi-finals and in the 100 metres event she did not advance to compete in the semi-finals. She also competed in the 4 × 100 metre mixed freestyle relay event.

References

External links
 

1997 births
Living people
Luxembourgian female swimmers
Sportspeople from Luxembourg City
Olympic swimmers of Luxembourg
Swimmers at the 2014 Summer Youth Olympics
Swimmers at the 2016 Summer Olympics
Swimmers at the 2020 Summer Olympics